Palkovo is a rural locality (a village) in Paustovskoye Rural Settlement, Vyaznikovsky District, Vladimir Oblast, Russia. The population was 39 as of 2010.

Geography 
Palkovo is located 18 km south of Vyazniki (the district's administrative centre) by road. Paustovo is the nearest rural locality.

References 

Rural localities in Vyaznikovsky District